Tamás Deák may refer to:
 Tamás Deák (composer) (born 1928), Hungarian composer and conductor
 Speak (Hungarian rapper) (Tamás Deák; born 1976), Hungarian rap artist, model and actor